Madrileños por el mundo is a travel show on Telemadrid directed by journalist Paloma Ferre. In this program, a team of reporters travels to various cities in the world to document the experiences of Madrilenians living abroad. The interviewees explain the reasons for their move, introduce the cities where they live and share the most interesting aspects of their daily life with the audience.

The program began as a special of Mi cámara y yo on 1 April 2005 and is shown as such in the opening sequence of all episodes up until July 2007, when it became a show of its own.

References

External links
Official website

2000s Spanish television series
Travel television series
Television spin-offs
Telemadrid original programming